Charles Fernando Corrêa (born 9 October 1992) is a Brazilian slalom canoeist who has competed at the international level since 2010.

Together with Anderson Oliveira he won a silver medal at the 2015 Pan American Games. They finished 11th in the C2 event at the 2016 Summer Olympics in Rio de Janeiro.

References

1992 births
Living people
Canoeists at the 2016 Summer Olympics
Olympic canoeists of Brazil
Brazilian male canoeists
Pan American Games medalists in canoeing
Pan American Games silver medalists for Brazil
Canoeists at the 2015 Pan American Games
Medalists at the 2015 Pan American Games
21st-century Brazilian people
People from Piraju